Bygones may refer to:

 Bygones (TV series), a British documentary programme 1967–1989
 Bygones (film), a 1987 Dutch film
 Bygones (sculpture), a 1976 work by Mark di Suvero in Houston, Texas, US
 Bygones, an American band featuring Zach Hill and Nick Reinhart of Tera Melos
 "Bygones (Won't Go)", a 2001 song by Nick Lowe from The Convincer

See also
 Bygones principle, an economic theory